The private brewery Heinrich Reissdorf GmbH & Co. KG was founded in 1894 by Heinrich Reissdorf in Cologne. It produces a top fermented beer called Reissdorf Kölsch.

References

External links
Brewery Reissdorf 

1894 establishments in Germany
Breweries in Germany
Beer brands of Germany
Food and drink companies established in 1894
Manufacturing companies based in Cologne